Fastest with the Mostest is a 1960 Warner Bros. Looney Tunes cartoon directed by Chuck Jones. The short was released on January 19, 1960, and stars Wile E. Coyote and the Road Runner.

The title is a reference to the epigram "Git thar fustest with the mostest", often erroneously attributed to Nathan Bedford Forrest.

Plot
1. Wile E. Coyote (Carnivorous - Slobbius) lights a firework, hoping for it to explode when Road Runner (Velocitus - Incalcublii) passes over it, but it explodes instantly. Wile E. catches up to the Road Runner and passes him, but fails to spot the end of the cliff and falls off. Wile E. climbs the cliff in sections and pulls himself barely up onto the end of the cliff, but the Road Runner then scares him off the cliff.

2. Wile E. then plans to drop a bomb on the Road Runner from a hot air balloon. However, while inflating the balloon, the balloon inflates the coyote instead; Wile E. floats through the air and bounces on the ground, desperately holding onto the bomb before he deflates and flies through the sky. When all the air leaves him, Wile lets go of the bomb, but falls through the sky. Wile E. hides to avoid the bomb, but the bomb lands near him. When the bomb starts ticking, Wile E. unscrews the bomb's head and removes the explosive. The bomb stops ticking, but a relieved Wile E. is blown up when it abruptly starts ticking again.

3. This time, Wile E. posts several white signs along the Road Runner's path in an effort to get the Road Runner to stop and eat "Tranquilized" bird seed. When the Road Runner obligingly munches, Wile E. prepares to go down in a bucket to trap him, only to struggle getting in the bucket. When Wile E. finally gets in, he unties the rope to lower himself, only for the rope to detach from the bucket, sending Wile E. falling. The bucket gets hung up on a tree branch, much to Wile E.'s relief, but he then falls out of the bucket when relaxing. The Road Runner lays down a spring, which bounces Wile E. (who holds a sign saying 'THANKS' in a rare act of gratitude) directly into the first branch, where he is hung up by the spring.

4. Wile E. then plants a detour sign in the road, directing the Road Runner to go down an outcropping. The Road Runner stops at the very edge, and Wile E. follows, only for the outcropping to break up and send Wile E. falling to the ground. Wile E.'s knife scrapes the skin off his back, and his fork lands in his tail, sending Wile E. flying upwards, where he is hung up on another branch by his napkin. The tree then falls down and pounds Wile E. through the ground and into a waterfall. Wile E. is swept downstream through a network of pipes before twisting himself out of a spigot. Wile E. then stares at the Road Runner, still standing on the floating piece of rock, much to Wile E.'s confusion. He pulls out a sign that says, 'I WOULDN'T MIND, EXCEPT THAT HE DEFIES THE LAW OF GRAVITY!,' but the Road Runner holds a sign that says, 'SURE, BUT I NEVER STUDIED LAW!' (a repeat gag from High Diving Hare), as he speeds away.

See also
 Looney Tunes and Merrie Melodies filmography (1960-1969)

References

External links
 
 

1960 animated films
1960 short films
Looney Tunes shorts
Warner Bros. Cartoons animated short films
American animated short films
Short films directed by Chuck Jones
Wile E. Coyote and the Road Runner films
Films scored by Milt Franklyn
Films about Canis
Animated films about birds
1960s Warner Bros. animated short films
Animated films without speech
Films with screenplays by Michael Maltese
Animated films about mammals
American comedy short films